François Daniel Roth (born 31 October 1942) is a French organist, composer, musicologist, and pedagogue. He was titular organist from 1985 until 2023 at the church of Saint-Sulpice in France's capital, Paris, alongside Sophie-Véronique Cauchefer-Choplin, and as of February 2023, will remain as emeritus titular organist.

Biography
Roth was born in Mulhouse in Vichy France to René Roth and his wife Angèle (née Higelin). He began his musical training at the conservatoire in his hometown with Joseph Victor Meyer. In 1960, he entered the Conservatoire de Paris, where he graduated with five first prizes—in organ and improvisation (1963, class of Rolande Falcinelli), harmony (1962, class of Maurice Duruflé), counterpoint and fugue (1963, class of Marcel Bitsch), and piano accompaniment (1970, class of Henriette Puig-Roget). He also pursued later studies in organ with Marie-Claire Alain (sister of Jehan and Olivier, as well as the daughter of Albert) after graduating from Falcinelli's class.

He was married to Odile Josèphe-Georgette Mangin (9 June 1939 in Neuilly-sur-Seine — 9 March 2015 in the 9th arrondissement of Paris).  They had four children, including the painter Anne-Marie Roth Baud (born 1968), the conductor and flautist François-Xavier Roth, and the violist Vincent Roth. His grandson through the former, Félix, plays the French horn.

Career

In 1963, Roth became Falcinelli's deputy at the great organ at Basilique du Sacré-Coeur in Paris. He succeeded her as titular organist in 1973, and held this position until 1985, when he was appointed titular organist at Saint-Sulpice in Paris, where his predecessors were Charles-Marie Widor, Marcel Dupré, and Jean-Jacques Grunenwald.

He won several prestigious organ competitions, including the competition of the "Amis de l'orgue" and Grand Prix in organ performance and improvisation at Concours de Chartres in 1971 (alongside Yves Devernay).

In 1974–76, he held the position of Artist-In-Residence at the National Shrine of the Immaculate Conception and professor of organ in the Catholic University of America in Washington, D.C. He held teaching positions of organ in the conservatoires of Marseille (1974-1979), Strasbourg (1979-1988) and Saarbrücken (1988-1995). In 1995–2007, he taught organ performance and improvisation at the Frankfurt University of Music and Performing Arts. In addition, he was consultant for the new organ by the Karl Schuke company at the Luxembourg Philharmonie, which he dedicated in 2005.

Daniel Roth is a Chevalier de la Légion d'Honneur, an Officier de l'Ordre des Arts et des Lettres, and an Honorary Fellow of the Royal College of Organists. In 2006, he received the European Prize of European sacred music from the German Schwäbisch Gmünd Festival.

In February 2023, Daniel Roth retired from Saint-Sulpice, remaining as emeritus titular organist and playing once per month the Sunday concert ("audition") at 10:00 AM and Mass at 11:00 AM. He is succeeded by Karol Mossakowski and Sophie-Véronique Cauchefer-Choplin as new titular organists at Saint-Sulpice.

Compositions

Organ solo
 Cinq Versets sur Veni Creator for organ manualiter (composed 1965. In: L'organiste liturgique n°53. Paris: Éditions Schola Cantorum)
 Évocation de la Pentecôte (composed 1979. Paris: Leduc, 1979/revised 1996, unpublished)
 Final Te Deum (composed 1981. Kassel: Bärenreiter, 1993)
 Introduction et Canzona (composed 1977–1990. Leutkirch/Allgäu: Pro Organo, 1992)
 Joie, Douleur et Gloire de Marie (composed 1990. London: Novello, 1990)
 Hommage à César Franck (composed 1990. Paris: Leduc, 1993)
 Après une Lecture... (composed 1993. In: 1er recueil d'œuvres pour orgue. Paris: Éditions Billaudot, 1993)
 Pour la nuit de Noël (composed 1993. Paris: Leduc, 1993):
Prélude "Veni, veni Emmanuel"
Communion
Postlude
 Triptyque - Hommage à Pierre Cochereau (composed 1995. Paris: Leduc, 1996):
Prélude
Andante
Toccata
 Petite Rhapsodie sur une chanson alsacienne (In: Elsässische Orgelmusik aus vier Jahrhunderten. Mainz: Schott, 1998)
 Artizarra - Fantaisie sur un chant populaire basque, pour la fête de I'Epiphanie (composed 1999. Mainz: Schott, 2002)
 Fantaisie fuguée sur Regina caeli (Mainz: Schott, 2007)
 Livre d'orgue pour le Magnificat, Hommage au Facteur d'orgues Aristide Cavaillé-Coll :
 Vol. 1 (Paris: Éditions Association Boëllmann-Gigout, 2007):
 1a. Magnificat
 1b. Et exsultavit 
 2. Quia respexit
 3. Quia fecit
 4. Et misericordia 
 5. Fecit potentiam
 Vol. 2 (Paris: Éditions Association Boëllmann-Gigout, 2011):
 6. Deposuit
 7. Esurientes
 8. Suscepit
 9. Sicut locutus est
 10. Gloria Patri
 Christus factus est - Fantaisie sur le graduel de la messe du Jeudi Saint (Sampzon: Delatour France, 2012)
 Contrastes (In: "Kölner Fanfaren - 17 festliche Orgelstücke". St. Augustin: Butz-Verlag, 2012)
 Ut, ré, mi - Fantaisie sur l'hymne à saint Jean Baptiste (Sampzon: Delatour France, 2014)
 Ave maris stella (In: "Orgues nouvelles", October 2014)
 Die Liebe... ein Feuer! La Pentecôte (composed 2015. Sampzon: Delatour France, 2017)
 Deux courtes pièces liturgiques (In: "Orgues nouvelles", June 2019):
 Alleluia
 Méditation
 Prélude pour l'Introït de la messe du jour de Noël, "Puer natus est" (composed 2019. in manuscript)

Organ for four hands
 Diptyque (composed 2009. Sampzon: Delatour France, 2011):
 Andante
 Allegro giocoso

Two organs
 Fantaisie-Dialogue (Sampzon: Delatour France, 2013)
 Quatre Pièces (composed in 2017, Manuscript)
 Prélude
 Offertoire
 Communion
 Sortie

Chamber music
 Légende for oboe and piano (Paris: Éditions Billaudot, 1989)
 Aïn Karim - Fantasia for flute and organ (Mainz: Schott, 1998)
 Pièce pour viola and organ (composed 2014. Manuscript)

Vocal works
 Reine du ciel a capella (Strasbourg: Éditions Caecilia, 1977)
 Notre Père a capella (Strasbourg: Éditions Caecilia, 1977)
 Gebt Zeugnis! for soloists, choir and organ (Mainz: Schott, 1998)
 Missa Brevis for SATB choir and organ (composed 1964/1998. Mainz: Schott, 2001):
 Kyrie 
 Gloria 
 Sanctus 
 Agnus Dei
 In manus tuas Domine for SATB (St. Augustin: Butz-Verlag, 2002)
 Ego sum panis for SATB choir and organ (St. Augustin: Butz-Verlag, 2005)
 Missa de archangelis for SATB choir and organ (Sampzon: Delatour France, 2006):
 Kyrie
 Sanctus
 Benedictus
 Agnus Dei
 3 Motets for mixed choir a capella (Sampzon: Delatour France, 2006):
 Ave Maria
 Dignare me, o Jesu
 Regina Caeli
 Ave Maria for soprano and organ (Sampzon: Delatour France, 2012)
 Missa festiva Orbis factor for mixed choir and organ (Sampzon: Delatour France, 2013)
 Missa beuronensis for organ and gregorian chant (St. Augustin: Butz-Verlag, 2016)
 Psalm 124: "Unsere Seele ist entronnen" (composed 2017. Manuscript)
 Cantata "Nun lobet Gott im hohen Thron" (composed 2017. Manuscript)
 Jubilate Deo for mixed choir a capella (composed 2020. Manuscript)

Orchestra
 Licht im Dunkel for organ, piano and orchestra:
 I. L'Espérance (Poème for orchestra) (Mainz: Schott, 2005)
 II. L'Amour (for organ, piano and orchestra) (Mainz: Schott, 2009)
 III. La Joie (Fantaisie for organ, piano and orchestra) (Mainz: Schott, 2007)

Transcriptions for organ
 César Franck: Interlude symphonique from the oratorio "Rédemption" (Kassel: Bärenreiter, 1996)
 Camille Saint-Saëns: Scherzo from Six Duos op. 8 for harmonium and piano (Paris: Éditions Jobert, 2001)
 César Franck: Symphony in D minor for orchestra; transcription after the composer's piano version for four hands (unpublished)

Bibliography
 Adolph, Wolfram: "Schöpferisch-musikalische Empathie. Daniel Roth zum 70. Geburtstag" (Organ – Journal für die Orgel 15, no. 3 (2012): 16–19).
 Dub-Attenti, Pierre-François and Zerbini, Christophe (eds.), Daniel Roth, Grand chœur. Entretiens avec Pierre-François Dub-Attenti et Christophe Zerbini, Volume I. Paris: Éditions Hortus, 2019. .
 Dub-Attenti, Pierre-François and Zerbini, Christophe (eds.), Daniel Roth, Grand chœur. Entretiens avec Pierre-François Dub-Attenti et Christophe Zerbini, Volume II. Paris: Éditions Hortus, 2019. .
 Hommage à Daniel Roth. Ein Künstlerportrait. Sulz am Neckar: ORGANpromotion, 2007. OP 6002 (DVD & CD).
 Orgeln haben eine Seele. Daniel Roth und die Cavaillé-Coll-Orgeln. TV documentation by Nele Münchmeyer. Mainz: ZDF/3Sat, 1994.
 Petersen, Birger (ed.). Licht im Dunkel – Lumière dans les ténèbres. Festschrift Daniel Roth zum 75. Geburtstag. Bonn: Dr. J. Butz Musikverlag, 2017. .
 Reifenberg, Peter: "Daniel Roth – Botschafter der großen Orgel von St. Sulpice" (Organ – Journal für die Orgel 2, no. 4 (1999): 30–36).
 Roth, Daniel. Le Grand-Orgue A. Cavaillé-Coll, Mutin de la Basilique du Sacré-Cœur de Montmartre à Paris (La Flûte harmonique, Numéro spécial 1985). Paris: Association A. Cavaillé-Coll, 1985.
 Roth, Daniel. "Einige Gedanken zur Interpretation des Orgelwerks von César Franck, zu seiner Orgel und zur Lemmens-Tradition." In: Orgel, Orgelmusik und Orgelspiel. Festschrift Michael Schneider zum 75. Geburtstag, edited by Christoph Wolff, 111–117. Kassel: Bärenreiter, 1985.
 Roth, Daniel, and Günter Lade. Die Cavaillé-Coll-Mutin-Orgel der Basilika Sacré-Coeur in Paris. Langen bei Bregenz: Edition Lade, 1992.
 Roth, Daniel, and Pierre-François Dub-Attenti. "L’orgue néo-classique et le grand orgue Aristide Cavaillé-Coll de Saint-Sulpice." L'Orgue 295-296 (2011).
 Roth, Daniel: "'Le plus bel orgue du monde'. Aspekte der Registrierung Bach'scher Orgelmusik auf Cavaillé-Coll-Orgeln, dargestellt am Beispiel der großen Orgel von Saint-Sulpice, Paris" (Organ – Journal für die Orgel 15, no. 3 (2012): 20–24, 26, 28–29).
 Roth, Daniel, and Pierre-François Dub-Attenti. The Neoclassical Organ and the Great Aristide Cavaillé-Coll Organ of Saint-Sulpice, Paris. London: Rhinegold Publishing, 2014.
 Roth, Daniel, and Pierre-François Dub-Attenti. "Überlegungen zur Interpretation an der Orgel." In: Licht im Dunkel – Lumière dans les ténèbres. Festschrift Daniel Roth zum 75. Geburtstag, edited by Birger Petersen, 265–419. Bonn: Dr. J. Butz Musikverlag, 2017.
 Roth, Daniel. "The use of rubato in the organ works of César Franck." (The American Organist 52, no. 2 (February 2018): 34–38).

References

External links
 Official Website of Daniel Roth
 Official Website of the Organs and Organists at Saint-Sulpice, Paris
 Biography of Daniel Roth on the Grand Prix de Chartres website
 American artist management website

1942 births
Living people
Musicians from Mulhouse
Benjamin T. Rome School of Music, Drama, and Art faculty
20th-century classical composers
21st-century classical composers
French classical composers
French male classical composers
French classical organists
French male organists
Organ improvisers
Cathedral organists
20th-century French composers
21st-century French composers
21st-century organists
20th-century French male musicians
21st-century French male musicians
Male classical organists